Alliana Volkart (born September 18, 2000 in San Carlos Centro, Argentina) is an Argentine sport shooter.

She won a silver medal in the women air rifle event at the 2018 South American Games, after a hard double shootoff in the finals, she obtained the 2nd place with 252.4 points, under only one tenth from the first place.

She has finished first in the 10m Air Rifle Women Youth category at the 2018 ISSF World Cup, held in Fort Benning, United States.

On May 26, 2016, Volkart and the YOG Argentine Youth team took part in the 26th Meeting of the Shooting Hopes.

Volkart made her Olympic debut at the 2018 Summer Youth Olympic Games participating in the  Girls' 10 m air rifle event where she ended 13th in the qualification round and thus did not get a place in the finals. She also participated in the Mixed-NOC team event getting to the quarterfinals and ending at the 9th place.

References

External links

2000 births
Living people
Argentine female sport shooters
Olympic shooters of Argentina
South American Games silver medalists for Argentina
South American Games medalists in shooting
ISSF rifle shooters
Shooters at the 2018 Summer Youth Olympics
Competitors at the 2018 South American Games
Sportspeople from Santa Fe Province
21st-century Argentine women